The 1995 Vienna Cup took place in October 1995. Skaters competed in the disciplines of men's singles, ladies' singles, and ice dancing.

Results

Men

Ladies

Ice dancing

References

Karl Schäfer Memorial
Karl Schafer Memorial, 1995
Karl Schafer Memorial